Oregon was admitted to the Union on February 14, 1859. Its current U.S. senators are Democrats Ron Wyden (serving since 1996) and Jeff Merkley (serving since 2009).

Prior to 1906, U.S. senators were elected by the Oregon Legislative Assembly. In 1904, Oregon voters passed a ballot measure that required U.S. senators to be selected by a popular vote and then endorsed by the state legislature. Beginning in 1914, U.S. senators were directly elected by popular vote on the basis of the 17th Amendment to the United States Constitution.

List of senators

|- style="height:2em"
! 1
| align=left | Delazon Smith
|  | Democratic
| nowrap | Feb 14, 1859 –Mar 3, 1859
| Elected in 1859.Lost re-election.
| 1
| 
| rowspan=3 | 1
| rowspan=3 | Elected in 1859.Retired.
| rowspan=3 nowrap | Feb 14, 1859 –Mar 3, 1861
| rowspan=3  | Democratic
| rowspan=3 align=right | Joseph Lane
! rowspan=3 | 1

|- style="height:2em"
| colspan=3 | Vacant
| nowrap | Mar 3, 1859 –Oct 1, 1860
| Legislature failed to elect.
| rowspan=7 | 2
| 

|- style="height:2em"
! rowspan=2 | 2
| rowspan=2 align=left | Edward Baker
| rowspan=2  | Republican
| rowspan=2 nowrap | Oct 1, 1860 –Oct 21, 1861
| rowspan=2 | Elected late in 1860.Died.

|- style="height:2em"
| 
| rowspan=6 | 2
| rowspan=6 | Election year unknown.Lost re-election.
| rowspan=6 nowrap | Mar 4, 1861 –Mar 3, 1867
| rowspan=6  | Democratic
| rowspan=6 align=right | James Nesmith
! rowspan=6 | 2

|- style="height:2em"
| colspan=3 | Vacant
| nowrap | Oct 21, 1861 –Feb 27, 1862
|  

|- style="height:2em"
! 3
| align=left | Benjamin Stark
|  | Democratic
| nowrap | Feb 27, 1862 – Sep 12, 1862
| Appointed to continue Baker's term.Retired when successor elected.

|- style="height:2em"
! rowspan=2 | 4
| rowspan=2 align=left | Benjamin F. Harding
| rowspan=2  | Democratic
| rowspan=2 nowrap | Sep 12, 1862 –Mar 3, 1865
| rowspan=2 | Elected to finish Baker's term.Retired.

|- style="height:2em"
| 

|- style="height:2em"
! rowspan=3 | 5
| rowspan=3 align=left | George H. Williams
| rowspan=3  | Republican
| rowspan=3 nowrap | Mar 4, 1865 –Mar 3, 1871
| rowspan=3 | Elected in 1864.Lost re-election.
| rowspan=3 | 3
| 

|- style="height:2em"
| 
| rowspan=3 | 3
| rowspan=3 | Election year unknown.Retired.
| rowspan=3 nowrap | Mar 4, 1867 –Mar 3, 1873
| rowspan=3  | Republican
| rowspan=3 align=right | Henry W. Corbett
! rowspan=3 | 3

|- style="height:2em"
| 

|- style="height:2em"
! rowspan=3 | 6
| rowspan=3 align=left | James K. Kelly
| rowspan=3  | Democratic
| rowspan=3 nowrap | Mar 4, 1871 –Mar 3, 1877
| rowspan=3 | Elected in 1870.Retired.
| rowspan=3 | 4
| 

|- style="height:2em"
| 
| rowspan=3 | 4
| rowspan=3 | Elected in 1872.Lost re-election.
| rowspan=3 nowrap | Mar 4, 1873 –Mar 3, 1879
| rowspan=3  | Republican
| rowspan=3 align=right | John H. Mitchell
! rowspan=3 | 4

|- style="height:2em"
| 

|- style="height:2em"
! rowspan=3 | 7
| rowspan=3 align=left | La Fayette Grover
| rowspan=3  | Democratic
| rowspan=3 nowrap | Mar 4, 1877 –Mar 3, 1883
| rowspan=3 | Election year unknown.Retired.
| rowspan=3 | 5
| 

|- style="height:2em"
| 
| rowspan=3 | 5
| rowspan=3 | Election year unknown.Retired.
| rowspan=3 nowrap | Mar 4, 1879 –Mar 3, 1885
| rowspan=3  | Democratic
| rowspan=3 align=right | James H. Slater
! rowspan=3 | 5

|- style="height:2em"
| 

|- style="height:2em"
! rowspan=7 | 8
| rowspan=7 align=left | Joseph N. Dolph
| rowspan=7  | Republican
| rowspan=7 nowrap | Mar 4, 1883 –Mar 3, 1895
| rowspan=4 | Elected in 1882.
| rowspan=4 | 6
| 

|- style="height:2em"
| 
| rowspan=4 | 6
|  
| nowrap | Mar 3, 1885 –Nov 18, 1885
| colspan=3 | Vacant

|- style="height:2em"
| rowspan=3 | Elected late in 1885.
| rowspan=6 nowrap | Nov 18, 1885 –Mar 3, 1897
| rowspan=6  | Republican
| rowspan=6 align=right | John H. Mitchell
! rowspan=6 | 6

|- style="height:2em"
| 

|- style="height:2em"
| rowspan=3 | Re-elected in 1888.Lost re-election.
| rowspan=3 | 7
| 

|- style="height:2em"
| 
| rowspan=3 | 7
| rowspan=3 | Re-elected in 1890.Lost re-election.

|- style="height:2em"
| 

|- style="height:2em"
! rowspan=4 | 9
| rowspan=4 align=left | George W. McBride
| rowspan=4  | Republican
| rowspan=4 nowrap | Mar 4, 1895 –Mar 3, 1901
| rowspan=4 | Elected in 1895.Lost renomination.
| rowspan=4 | 8
| 

|- style="height:2em"
| 
| rowspan=4 | 8
|  
| nowrap | Mar 3, 1897 –Oct 7, 1898
| colspan=3 | Vacant

|- style="height:2em"
| rowspan=3 | Elected late in 1898.Retired.
| rowspan=3 nowrap | Oct 7, 1898 –Mar 3, 1903
| rowspan=3  | Republican
| rowspan=3 align=right | Joseph Simon
! rowspan=3 | 7

|- style="height:2em"
| 

|- style="height:2em"
! rowspan=3 | 10
| rowspan=3 align=left | John H. Mitchell
| rowspan=3  | Republican
| rowspan=3 nowrap | Mar 4, 1901 –Dec 8, 1905
| rowspan=3 | Elected in 1901.Died.
| rowspan=6 | 9
| 

|- style="height:2em"
| 
| rowspan=6 | 9
| rowspan=6 | Elected in 1903.Lost re-election.
| rowspan=6 nowrap | Mar 4, 1903 –Mar 3, 1909
| rowspan=6  | Republican
| rowspan=6 align=right | Charles William Fulton
! rowspan=6 | 8

|- style="height:2em"
| 

|- style="height:2em"
| colspan=3 | Vacant
| nowrap | Dec 8, 1905 –Dec 21, 1905
|  

|- style="height:2em"
! 11
| align=left | John M. Gearin
|  | Democratic
| nowrap | Dec 21, 1905 –Jan 23, 1907
| Appointed to continue Mitchell's term.Retired when successor elected.

|- style="height:2em"
! 12
| align=left | Frederick W. Mulkey
|  | Republican
| nowrap | Jan 23, 1907 –Mar 3, 1907
| Elected to finish Mitchell's term.Retired.

|- style="height:2em"
! rowspan=3 | 13
| rowspan=3 align=left | Jonathan Bourne Jr.
| rowspan=3  | Republican
| rowspan=3 nowrap | Mar 4, 1907 –Mar 3, 1913
| rowspan=3 | Elected in 1907.Lost renomination.
| rowspan=3 | 10
| 

|- style="height:2em"
| 
| rowspan=3 | 10
| rowspan=3 | Elected in 1909.
| rowspan=10 nowrap | Mar 4, 1909 –Mar 3, 1921
| rowspan=10  | Democratic
| rowspan=10 align=right | George E. Chamberlain
! rowspan=10 | 9

|- style="height:2em"
| 

|- style="height:2em"
! rowspan=3 | 14
| rowspan=3 align=left | Harry Lane
| rowspan=3  | Democratic
| rowspan=3 nowrap | Mar 4, 1913 –May 23, 1917
| rowspan=3 | Elected in 1913.Died.
| rowspan=7 | 11
| 

|- style="height:2em"
| 
| rowspan=7 | 11
| rowspan=7 | Re-elected in 1914.Lost re-election.

|- style="height:2em"
| 

|- style="height:2em"
| colspan=3 | Vacant
| nowrap | May 23, 1917 –May 29, 1917
|  

|- style="height:2em"
! 15
| align=left | Charles L. McNary
|  | Republican
| nowrap | May 29, 1917 –Nov 5, 1918
| Appointed to continue Lane's term.Not elected to finish Lane's term.

|- style="height:2em"
! 16
| align=left | Frederick W. Mulkey
|  | Republican
| nowrap | Nov 6, 1918 –Dec 17, 1918
| Elected to finish Lane's term.Resigned early to give successor preferential seniority.

|- style="height:2em"
! rowspan=17 | 17
| rowspan=17 align=left | Charles L. McNary
| rowspan=17  | Republican
| rowspan=17 nowrap | Dec 18, 1918 –Feb 25, 1944
| Appointed to finish Lane/Mulkey's term, having already been elected to the next term.

|- style="height:2em"
| rowspan=3 | Elected in 1918.
| rowspan=3 | 12
| 

|- style="height:2em"
| 
| rowspan=3 | 12
| rowspan=3 | Elected in 1920.Lost re-election.
| rowspan=3 nowrap | Mar 4, 1921 –Mar 3, 1927
| rowspan=3  | Republican
| rowspan=3 align=right | Robert N. Stanfield
! rowspan=3 | 10

|- style="height:2em"
| 

|- style="height:2em"
| rowspan=3 | Re-elected in 1924.
| rowspan=3 | 13
| 

|- style="height:2em"
| 
| rowspan=3 | 13
| rowspan=3 | Elected in 1926.
| rowspan=6 nowrap | Mar 4, 1927 –Jan 31, 1938
| rowspan=6  | Republican
| rowspan=6 align=right | Frederick Steiwer
! rowspan=6 | 11

|- style="height:2em"
| 

|- style="height:2em"
| rowspan=3 | Re-elected in 1930.
| rowspan=3 | 14
| 

|- style="height:2em"
| 
| rowspan=6 | 14
| rowspan=3 | Re-elected in 1932.Resigned.

|- style="height:2em"
| 

|- style="height:2em"
| rowspan=6 | Re-elected in 1936.
| rowspan=6 | 15
| 

|- style="height:2em"
|  
| nowrap | Jan 31, 1938 –Feb 1, 1938
| colspan=3 | Vacant

|- style="height:2em"
| Appointed to continue Steiwer's term.Retired when successor elected.
| nowrap | Feb 1, 1938 –Nov 9, 1938
|  | Democratic
| align=right | Alfred Reames
! 12

|- style="height:2em"
| Elected to finish Steiwer's term.Retired.
| nowrap | Nov 9, 1938 –Jan 3, 1939
|  | Republican
| align=right | Alexander Barry
! 13

|- style="height:2em"
| 
| rowspan=5 | 15
| rowspan=5 | Elected in 1938.Lost renomination.
| rowspan=5 nowrap | Jan 3, 1939 –Jan 3, 1945
| rowspan=5  | Republican
| rowspan=5 align=right | Rufus C. Holman
! rowspan=5 | 14

|- style="height:2em"
| 

|- style="height:2em"
| Re-elected in 1942.Died.
| rowspan=5 | 16
| 

|- style="height:2em"
| colspan=3 | Vacant
| nowrap | Feb 25, 1944 –Mar 13, 1944
|  

|- style="height:2em"
! rowspan=7 | 18
| rowspan=7 align=left | Guy Cordon
| rowspan=7  | Republican
| rowspan=7 nowrap | Mar 13, 1944 –Jan 3, 1955
| rowspan=3 | Appointed to continue McNary's term.Elected in 1944 to finish McNary's term.

|- style="height:2em"
| 
| rowspan=3 | 16
| rowspan=3 | Elected in 1944.
| rowspan=16 nowrap | Jan 3, 1945 –Jan 3, 1969
| rowspan=4  | Republican
| rowspan=16 align=right | Wayne Morse
! rowspan=16 | 15

|- style="height:2em"
| 

|- style="height:2em"
| rowspan=4 | Re-elected in 1948.Lost re-election.
| rowspan=4 | 17
| 

|- style="height:2em"
| 
| rowspan=4 | 17
| rowspan=4 | Re-elected in 1950.

|- style="height:2em"
| rowspan=2  | Independent

|- style="height:2em"
| 

|- style="height:2em"
! rowspan=3 | 19
| rowspan=3 align=left | Richard L. Neuberger
| rowspan=3  | Democratic
| rowspan=3 nowrap | Jan 3, 1955 –Mar 9, 1960
| rowspan=3 | Elected in 1954.Died.
| rowspan=6 | 18
| 
| rowspan=10  | Democratic

|- style="height:2em"
| 
| rowspan=6 | 18
| rowspan=6 | Re-elected in 1956.

|- style="height:2em"
| 

|- style="height:2em"
| colspan=3 | Vacant
| nowrap | Mar 9, 1960 –Mar 23, 1960
|  

|- style="height:2em"
! 20
| align=left | Hall S. Lusk
|  | Democratic
| nowrap | Mar 23, 1960 –Nov 9, 1960
| Appointed to continue Neuberger's term.Retired when successor elected.

|- style="height:2em"
! rowspan=4 | 21
| rowspan=4 align=left | Maurine Neuberger
| rowspan=4  | Democratic
| rowspan=4 nowrap | Nov 9, 1960 –Jan 3, 1967
| Elected to finish her husband's term.

|- style="height:2em"
| rowspan=3 | Elected to full term in 1960.Retired.
| rowspan=3 | 19
| 

|- style="height:2em"
| 
| rowspan=3 | 19
| rowspan=3 | Re-elected in 1962.Lost re-election.

|- style="height:2em"
| 

|- style="height:2em"
! rowspan=17 | 22
| rowspan=17 align=left | Mark Hatfield
| rowspan=17  | Republican
| rowspan=17 nowrap | Jan 3, 1967 –Jan 3, 1997
| rowspan=3 | Elected in 1966.Didn't take seat until Jan 10, 1967, in order to finish his term as Governor of Oregon.
| rowspan=3 | 20
| 

|- style="height:2em"
| 
| rowspan=3 | 20
| rowspan=3 | Elected in 1968.
| rowspan=14 nowrap | Jan 3, 1969 –Oct 1, 1995
| rowspan=14  | Republican
| rowspan=14 align=right | Bob Packwood
! rowspan=14 | 16

|- style="height:2em"
| 

|- style="height:2em"
| rowspan=3 | Re-elected in 1972.
| rowspan=3 | 21
| 

|- style="height:2em"
| 
| rowspan=3 | 21
| rowspan=3 | Re-elected in 1974.

|- style="height:2em"
| 

|- style="height:2em"
| rowspan=3 | Re-elected in 1978.
| rowspan=3 | 22
| 

|- style="height:2em"
| 
| rowspan=3 | 22
| rowspan=3 | Re-elected in 1980.

|- style="height:2em"
| 

|- style="height:2em"
| rowspan=3 | Re-elected in 1984.
| rowspan=3 | 23
| 

|- style="height:2em"
| 
| rowspan=3 | 23
| rowspan=3 | Re-elected in 1986.

|- style="height:2em"
| 

|- style="height:2em"
| rowspan=5 | Re-elected in 1990.Retired.
| rowspan=5 | 24
| 

|- style="height:2em"
| 
| rowspan=5 | 24
| rowspan=2 | Re-elected in 1992.Resigned.

|- style="height:2em"
| 

|- style="height:2em"
|  
| nowrap | Oct 1, 1995 –Feb 5, 1996
| colspan=3 | Vacant

|- style="height:2em"
| rowspan=2 | Elected in 1996 to finish Packwood's term.
| rowspan=17 nowrap | Feb 5, 1996 –Present
| rowspan=17  | Democratic
| rowspan=17 align=right | Ron Wyden
! rowspan=17 | 17

|- style="height:2em"
! rowspan=6 | 23
| rowspan=6 align=left | Gordon Smith
| rowspan=6  | Republican
| rowspan=6 nowrap | Jan 3, 1997 –Jan 3, 2009
| rowspan=3 | Elected in 1996.
| rowspan=3 | 25
| 

|- style="height:2em"
| 
| rowspan=3 | 25
| rowspan=3 | Re-elected in 1998.

|- style="height:2em"
| 

|- style="height:2em"
| rowspan=3 | Re-elected in 2002.Lost re-election.
| rowspan=3 | 26
| 

|- style="height:2em"
| 
| rowspan=3 | 26
| rowspan=3 | Re-elected in 2004.

|- style="height:2em"
| 

|- style="height:2em"
! rowspan=9 | 24
| rowspan=9 align=left | Jeff Merkley
| rowspan=9  | Democratic
| rowspan=9 nowrap | Jan 3, 2009 –Present
| rowspan=3 | Elected in 2008.
| rowspan=3 | 27
| 

|- style="height:2em"
| 
| rowspan=3 | 27
| rowspan=3 | Re-elected in 2010.

|- style="height:2em"
| 

|- style="height:2em"
| rowspan=3 | Re-elected in 2014.
| rowspan=3 | 28
| 

|- style="height:2em"
| 
| rowspan=3 | 28
| rowspan=3 | Re-elected in 2016.

|- style="height:2em"
| 

|- style="height:2em"
| rowspan=3  |  Re-elected in 2020.
| rowspan=3 | 29
| 

|- style="height:2em"
| 
| rowspan=3|29
| rowspan=3| Re-elected in 2022.

|- style="height:2em"
| 

|- style="height:2em"
| rowspan=2 colspan=5 | To be determined in the 2026 election.
| rowspan=2|30
| 

|- style="height:2em"
| 
| 30
| colspan=5 | To be determined in the 2028 election.

See also

 United States congressional delegations from Oregon
 List of United States representatives from Oregon
 Elections in Oregon

References

External links
 

 
United States Senators
Oregon